Bishop Canevin High School is a Jesuit-inspired high school in Pittsburgh, Pennsylvania, United States. The school is located in the East Carnegie neighborhood of the city.

History 

In 1958, Bishop John Dearden, Bishop of Pittsburgh, announced plans for a brand new co-institutional diocesan high school to serve the Chartiers Valley on Morange Road, next to St. Paul Orphanage, which is now St. Paul Seminary. The school was to be named Chartiers Catholic High School. The name was changed soon after to recognize former Bishop of Pittsburgh Regis Canevin. Father Leo G. Henry was then named the first headmaster. Canevin High School opened to 435 boys and girls on September 10, 1959; in June 1963, 303 students graduated. Construction on the building was not yet finished, and would not for at least another six months. The faculty was made up of priests, five communities of nuns, and a small number of laypeople. Since it was a co-institutional school, there were different faculties and facilities for the boys and girls. However, there was one administration and the boys and girls were free to mix in a few locations, such as the science labs and the library; Latin 3-4 and one of the advanced math classes were coeducational due to the small class sizes.  The band/orchestra was also coed Remnants of this system can be found in the numbering patterns for the rooms (G101 for first floor Girl's wing and B101 for first floor Boy's wing). Tuition was free to the students, as long as they were a member of the 21 parishes which made up the Canevin district. In 1961, the diocese signed a contract with the Immaculate Conception Province of the Order of Friars Minor Conventual to take over the administration and boy's faculty. Sent to Canevin were an original group of 8 friars, led by Fr. Gervase M. Beyer, O.F.M. Conv. They were soon supplanted with more friars from Trenton Catholic High School, which had recently closed. After the 1962 school year, Fr. Gervase became headmaster and oversaw the first Middle States Accreditation of Canevin in 1965. The 70s saw several headmasters. In 1969, Fr. Gervase left Canevin and was replaced by Fr. Canice Connors O.F.M. Conv. Under his guidance, Canevin became fully coeducational, and boys and girls began to have classes together. After Fr. Canice, Fr. Julian Zambanini O.F.M. Conv. became headmaster; followed by Fr. Robert Sochor, O.F.M Conv. After Fr. Robert, the Diocese of Pittsburgh assumed responsibility for the administration of the school from the friars. At that time, Fr. Donald Sotak became headmaster. After the 1978-79 school year, Mr. John Maurer became headmaster, the first lay headmaster of any Pittsburgh Diocesan high School. Mr. Maurer guided the school through its 25th anniversary in 1984. However, in 1980, he was given the difficult task of saying goodbye to the Franciscans that had served the school for 19 years as they moved on to other duties. In 1987, after hearing accounts of the common misconception that Canevin was a public school, Mr. Maurer changed the name of the school to Canevin Catholic High School. During his tenure as Principal, Mr. Kenneth Sinagra, changed the name of the school to Bishop Canevin High School, to honor the school’s namesake, Bishop Regis Canevin, Pittsburgh’s first “native-born” Bishop.

Notable alumni 
Tom Clements ‘71 
Anita Astorino Kulik ‘82
Dan Deasy ‘84
Jim Bolla ‘70
Jesse Joyce’96
Matthew Stocke ‘90

Notable faculty

Notes and references 

High schools in Pittsburgh
Catholic secondary schools in Pennsylvania
Educational institutions established in 1959
1959 establishments in Pennsylvania